Bobby Ed Shepherd (born November 18, 1951) is a United States circuit judge of the United States Court of Appeals for the Eighth Circuit. He maintains chambers in El Dorado, the seat of Union County in south Arkansas.

Education 
Shepherd received a Bachelor of Arts degree from Ouachita Baptist University in Arkadelphia in 1973. He received his Juris Doctor from the University of Arkansas School of Law in Fayetteville in 1975.

Career
Shepherd was a United States magistrate judge for the United States District Court for the Western District of Arkansas from 1993 until he joined the Eighth Circuit. His appointment was only the second time ever a sitting magistrate judge had been elevated directly to a federal court of appeals. From 1991 to 1993, Shepherd was an Arkansas state trial judge for the 13th Judicial Circuit, in the southern end of the state. Previously, Shepherd had been in private practice as an attorney in Arkansas from 1976 to 1990.

Federal judicial service 

Shepherd was nominated to the Eighth Circuit by President George W. Bush on May 18, 2006, to fill a seat to be vacated by Judge Morris S. Arnold. Shepherd was confirmed by the United States Senate by voice vote on July 20, 2006, even though Arnold was not set to retire for several months yet. Shepherd was Bush's seventh appointment to the Eighth Circuit. He received his commission on October 10, 2006. 
Shepherd began hearing cases October 18, 2006 following Arnold's becoming a senior judge.

Cases
United States v. Neil Scott Kramer

References

External links

1951 births
Living people
21st-century American judges
Judges of the United States Court of Appeals for the Eighth Circuit
People from Arkadelphia, Arkansas
United States court of appeals judges appointed by George W. Bush
United States magistrate judges
University of Arkansas School of Law alumni